Dichomeris obsepta is a moth in the family Gelechiidae. It was described by Edward Meyrick in 1935. It is found in China (Hong Kong, Anhui, Gansu, Guangdong, Henan, Hubei, Hunan, Jiangsu, Jiangxi, Sichuan, Zhejiang).

References

Moths described in 1935
obsepta